R510 road may refer to:
 R510 road (Ireland)
 R510 (South Africa)